Krasnaya Nov is a rural locality in Vyshnederevensky Selsoviet Rural Settlement, Lgovsky District, Kursk Oblast, Russia. Population:

Geography 
The village is located on the Byk River (a left tributary of the Seym), 42.5 km from the Russia–Ukraine border, 65 km south-west of Kursk, 6.5 km south-east of the district center – the town Lgov, 4.5 km from the selsoviet center – Vyshniye Derevenki.

 Climate
Krasnaya Nov has a warm-summer humid continental climate (Dfb in the Köppen climate classification).

Transport 
Krasnaya Nov is located 2.5 km from the road of regional importance  (Kursk – Lgov – Rylsk – border with Ukraine), 1.5 km from the road  (Lgov – Sudzha), 2.5 km from the nearest (closed) railway halt Sugrov (railway line Lgov I — Podkosylev).

The rural locality is situated 72 km from Kursk Vostochny Airport, 139 km from Belgorod International Airport and 274 km from Voronezh Peter the Great Airport.

References

Notes

Sources

Rural localities in Lgovsky District